The Nora School is a progressive, college preparatory high school in Silver Spring, Maryland that is intentionally small by design.  Grades 9-12.  The Nora School's mission is to guide students to identify their talents, understand where their challenges lie, and honor their unique identities. It works toward this goal through a diverse, active curriculum that uses teaching and operational strategies to promote social equity, justice, and environmental stewardship.  The Nora School is a nonprofit school with 501(c)(3) status. 

Social Education strategies include monthly Community Service projects, a student trip that follows the path of Civil Rights from Atlanta, Georgia to Selma, Alabama, individual College Counseling, and weekly Advisory meetings.  Students often attend Leadership Conferences in and out of the state, and internal classes such as Future Issues, Global Communities, and Environmental Science bring focused learning to important topics.

History
Founded in 1964 by Swiss educator Leon Eberhard as The Eberhard School, the school has changed names and locations several times. In 1968, Eberhard moved the school from Dupont Circle to the new Washington Ethical Society building at 16th Street and Kalmia Street NW, where it remained until 2000.  Eberhard left the school in 1975 to found the Acton School in Northern Virginia. The school was adopted by the Ethical Society and renamed Washington Ethical Society School. Eberhard died in 1994.

The school fell on hard times financially, and had only 12 students when Sally Fisher from Sandy Spring Friends School was hired as Head of School in 1981.  Fisher restored the school to academic and financial health over the next decade. In 1988 the school was renamed Washington Ethical High School, as it no longer had a formal affiliation with the Ethical Society.  David Mullen was hired as Head of School in 1991.  The school gained its first accreditation from the Middle States Association of Colleges and Schools in 1994.

Due to the space and enrollment limitations of the Ethical Society building, the school began searching for property in the mid-1990s, culminating in the purchase of land in Silver Spring, Maryland. With a donation from former faculty member Beau Kaplan and his wife Linda, the school built a new building and grew enrollment by 50% in 2000. That same year the school was renamed The Nora School in honor of the Kaplan's late daughter. As of 2015, Beau Kaplan is Chair Emeritus.

The school expanded again in the fall of 2016, adding a second floor to its building on Sligo Avenue, doubling its size to approximately 1100 square feet and adding a second science lab, a music room, student lounge and seminar room among other spaces.

References

External links

Washington Small Schools Association
National Coalition of Small Schools
Middle States Association of Colleges and Schools
National Association of Independent Schools

Downtown Silver Spring, Maryland
Educational institutions established in 1964
Ethical movement
Private high schools in Montgomery County, Maryland
Preparatory schools in Maryland
1964 establishments in Maryland